Myra Monoka, is an international singer and songwriter who creates soulful electronic music.

Monoka has written and sang top records such as Chris.SU feat. Mira - Together in the Night  (Andy C - Nightlife 6) Remix of the year 2012, Mongoose feat. Mira - Comin Alive Best Videos of 2012 }, Soerii & Poolek - Brutalis Nyar  as well as contributed to projects that have gone on to reach the top 5 on charts, such as Bogi and the Berry - Korut, Mongoose feat. Myra Monoka - Play.

Recent achievements

She cowrote and sang the Hungarian hit with Willcox - Remember. The track was the most Shazamed Hungarian track for eight weeks in Hungary.

She sings the official remix song of the Hungarian superproduction (movie with a budget of 1billion HUF)  called PAPPA PIA,  that she created with DJ Begi Lotfi ( Petofi Award - Best DJ of the year.) The song reached the 4th place on the Hungarian MAHASZ list this month in August.

In May she reached 1st and the 11th place with “ Stereo Palma ft. Myra - Because of the Night “ on the German DJ Playlist (DDP)

This year in Hungary she received her first Platinum album for her pop song. ”Soerii&Poolek - Hurrikán”.

Early life

Myra was born on July 6, 1988 in Budapest, Hungary as Nagy Eszter.  Myra started playing the cello at age 6 and got accepted to the Bela Bartok Conservatory at age 13. In Miami, America, she became a sound engineer at SAE Institute and had a chance to learn from Grammy Awarded/Nominated teachers.

Discography
2020 - Willcox ft. Myra Monoka - Over
2018 - Willcox - Remember 
2017 - Mongoose feat. Myra Monoka - Ma Még 
2017 - Stereo Palma feat. Myra - Because of the Night 
2017 - Lotfi Begi feat. Myra - Pappa Pia Hivatalos Remix - Kell egy kis örültség
2015 - Supapowa - Myra Monoka & Mongoose - Single - AMPM 
2015 - Me on the Rocks - Myra Monoka - Single - AMPM 
2015 - Countdown - Myra Monoka - Single - AMPM 
2015 - Brutalis Nyar - Soerii & Poolek - Single -  Gold Record Music Kft.
2015 - Mesmerized - Plastic Heaven - EP - StayFly Records 
2013 - Together in the Night feat. Mira - Chris.SU - FATE Recordings 
2012 - Comin Alive - Mongoose feat. Mira - Power to us EP -  RUNE CHILL Recordings Amazon ]
2012 - Higher  - Chris.SU - Fate EP - Subtitles Music (UK)

References

Additional Sources
Myra on Friction's D&B Show on BBC Radio 1 
Myra on the cover of GC Mag Australia Page 42-46 

Living people
Hungarian musicians
1988 births